Tera Intezaar is a 2017 Indian supernatural-romantic drama film directed by Raajeev Walia. It is produced by Aman Mehta and Bijal Mehta.The movie turned out to be a disaster in box office.

The film stars Arbaaz Khan and Sunny Leone in lead roles and was released on 1 December 2017.

Plot 
This film depicts the story of a successful exhibitionist who falls in love with a gifted yet unearthed painter. Her life takes a jeopardy when four of his clients want a painting from her lover to which he does not agree. Then her lover goes missing suddenly. Now she has to find her love and those guys want that painting at any cost. This forms the rest of the story.

Cast 
Arbaaz Khan as Veer Singh Rajput / Prince Singh Rajput (Twin brothers)
Sunny Leone as Rounak
Aarya Babbar as Vikram
Hanif Noyda as Jijaji
Salil Ankola as Chanakya
Sudha Chandran as Black Magician Madam
Richa Sharma
Bhani Singh as Bobby (Antagonist)
Gauahar Khan Dancer in Barbie song
Sarita Joshi

Production

Development 
The official announcement of the film was announced in the second half of May 2016. The title of the film was to be Tera Intezaar.

Casting 
The makers of the film have chosen Arbaaz Khan and Sunny Leone to play the lead roles in the film.

Filming 
The principal photography of the film commenced in the second half of July 2016. The film will be shot in Mumbai. Some parts of the film will also be shot in Kutch as well as in international locations such as Mauritius. The first schedule of the film wrapped up on 23 August 2016. in ramaji rao studio Hyderabad. The choreographer for the film is Mudassar Khan.

Film Tera Intezaar completed a 15 days schedule in Mauritius starting from 8 to 24 November 2016.

Mattel controversy 
The Delhi High Court issued a notice to the producers of the film for using the word "Barbie" in a song without the permission of Mattel Inc, the manufacturers of the trademark Barbie dolls.
The single judge bench of Justice Rajiv Sahai Endlaw, however, refused to grant ex-parte injunction against the toy company. The court also noted that the plea may be considered at the notice stage.

Mattel told the court in its plea that the song and its lyrics have been used "in a manner antagonistic to the values and interests of the customers target base, the plaintiffs cater to". The song, which features actor Sunny Leone, is "provocative and inappropriate for younger girls and children, tarnishing and degrading the distinctive quality of the Barbie", the company said.

Justice Endlaw noted that courts in the United States had held that music companies’ use of "Barbie" in a song was not an infringement of the toy manufacturer's trademark. Quoting from an older judgment passed by the United States Court of Appeals, Ninth Circuit from 2002, the judge said, "The parties are advised to chill.”

Soundtrack 

The music of the film is composed by Raaj Aashoo while the lyrics have been penned by Shabbir Ahmed. The first song of the film titled as "Khali Khali Dil" which is sung by Armaan Malik and Payal Dev was released on 26 October 2017. The second track of the film to be released was "Barbie Girl" which is sung by Swati Sharma, Lil Golu and Hritiqa Chheber was released on 6 November 2017. The soundtrack was released by T-Series on 11 November 2017.

Critical reception 

Reza Noorani of The Times of India gave the film a rating of 1.5 out of 5 saying that, "With weak performances, forced VFX and a badly structured script, 'Tera Intezaar' is a film where you will be waiting desperately for the end credits to roll." Rohit Vats of Hindustan Times gave the film a rating of 0 out of 5 saying that, "From performing planchette to listening conversations via paintings, Tera Intezaar can entertain you at many levels." Prasanna D Zore of Rediff gave the film a rating of 0.5 out of 5 and said that, "There is nothing in Tera Intezaar to keep you hooked." Shubhra Gupta of The Indian Express gave the film a rating of 0 out of 5 and criticized the film saying that, "Who made this film? Why was it made? Who was it made for? Is it even a film?" Namrata Joshi of The Hindu criticized the film saying that, "'Tera Intezaar' is the prime candidate for bagging "So Bad That It Is Too Good" award of 2017". Bollywood Hungama gave the film a rating of 1.5 out of 5 and said that, "Tera Intezaar has a jumbled plot line that lacks logic and fails to establish any connect. It neither succeeds in telling a supernatural story nor does it manage to act as a quintessential love story." Bollywood Life gave the film a rating of 1 out of 5 saying that, "The plot is paper thin, stretched with songs that don't mesh seamlessly into the narrative." Saibal Chatterjee of NDTV gave the film a rating of 0.5 out of 5 saying that, "You might ask: why does this film deserve even half a star? Well, it is for whoever it is who dared to believe that Tera Intezaar could be passed off as cinema. Takes loads of guts or a whole lot of stupidity!"

References

External links 
 

Indian romantic musical films
Indian musical drama films
Indian romantic drama films
2010s Hindi-language films
Films set in Mumbai
2017 films
Films shot in Mauritius
2017 romantic drama films
Films shot at Ramoji Film City
2010s romantic musical films
2010s musical drama films
Cross-dressing in Indian films